Cyaneophytoecia sospita is a species of beetle in the family Cerambycidae, and the only species in the genus Cyaneophytoecia. It was described by Pascoe in 1867.

References

Saperdini
Beetles described in 1867